Vladimir M. Yesipov (Владимир М. Есипов) (fl. 1960s) was a Russian conductor active during the 1960s and 1970s.

He conducted a Tchaikovsky concert in Beijing in 1960. He was mentioned in Soviet Music (1965) along with Yuri Aranovich for his "creative energy". He conducted at the Stanislavsky and Nemirovich-Danchenko Moscow Music Theatre during the 1970s, including Der Bettelstudent in 1971, and Massenet's Manon in 1973.

Discography
 Bizet - Don Procopio in Russian, 1967
 Yevstigney Fomin - Orpheus and Eurydice (Орфей и Эвридика) 1967
 Rachmaninov - Aleko
 Kozlovsky - Requiem Mass, Melodija 1988
 Mussorgsky - Sorochinsky Fair

References

Living people
21st-century Russian conductors (music)
Russian male conductors (music)
21st-century Russian male musicians
Year of birth missing (living people)